The Inspector General of the United States Army serves to "provide impartial, objective and unbiased advice and oversight to the Army through relevant, timely and thorough inspection, assistance, investigations, and training." The Inspector General has historically been a high-ranking Army official before their appointment to the position. Since 1973, the position has been a lieutenant general billet.

List

Notes

References

Further reading

Army
Inspector
Inspectors General
inspectors General of the U.S. Army